Grammar-oriented programming (GOP) and Grammar-oriented Object Design (GOOD) are good for designing and creating a domain-specific programming language (DSL) for a specific business domain.

GOOD can be used to drive the execution of the application or it can be used to embed the declarative processing logic of a context-aware component (CAC) or context-aware service (CAS). GOOD is a method for creating and maintaining dynamically reconfigurable software architectures driven by business-process architectures. The business compiler was used to capture business processes within real-time workshops for various lines of business and create an executable simulation of the processes used.

Instead of using one DSL for the entire programming activity, GOOD suggests the combination of defining domain-specific behavioral semantics in conjunction with the use of more traditional, general purpose programming languages.

See also
Adaptive grammar
Definite clause grammar
Extensible programming
Language-oriented programming
Dialecting
Transformation language

External links
 Manners Externalize Semantics for On-demand Composition of Context-aware Services
 "Empowering the Business Analyst for On-demand Computing" for an example of using GOOD.

Domain-specific programming languages